Palpu Pushpangadan (born 23 January 1944) is a former Director of the Tropical Botanical Garden and Research Institute (TBGRI) in Kerala. He is also a former Director of the National Botanical Research Institute (NBRI), Lucknow and Rajiv Gandhi Centre for Biotechnology, Thiruvananthapuram. He received the Padmashri Award from the Government of India in 2010.

Born on 23 January 1944 at Prakkulam in Kollam district in Kerala, Pushpangadan is known for his contribution to plant sciences. He has got  multidisciplinary training  in cytogenetics, plant breeding, bioprospecting, biotechnology, conservation biology, ethnobiology, ethnopharmacology and pharmacognosy.

He has published about 317 research papers/articles in various national and international journals, authored/edited 15 books, contributed 41 chapters in books in taxonomy, plant breeding, conservation biology, biotechnology, ethnobiology,  ethnopharmacology and IPR, etc.  Filed/Awarded 85 patents in herbal drugs/products jointly with other scientists. 15 of his patented products are already commercialized.

References

External links
 
 P. Pushpangadan Model of benefit sharing
 A model to fight bio-piracy
 
 P. Pushpangadan Model of benefit sharing

Malayali people
Recipients of the Padma Shri in science & engineering
Scientists from Kollam
Living people
1944 births
20th-century Indian botanists
Indian agriculturalists
Indian geneticists
Cytogenetics